Copperhead, in comics, may refer to:

 Copperhead (DC Comics), two characters of that name published by DC Comics
 Copperhead (Marvel Comics), three characters of that name published by Marvel Comics
 Copperhead (Image Comics), an ongoing space western series published by Image Comics

See also
Copperhead (disambiguation)